The Anarchism of Nestor Makhno, 1918–1921 is a book-length study of Nestor Makhno written by Michael Palij and published by the University of Washington Press in 1976.

Further reading

External links 

 

1976 non-fiction books
American history books
History books about Ukraine
Books about anarchism
Books about military personnel
Biographies (books)
University of Washington Press books
Makhnovshchina